Ólafsfjörður Airport  is an airport serving Ólafsfjörður, Iceland.

See also
Transport in Iceland
List of airports in Iceland

References

 Google Earth

External links
 OurAirports - Ólafsfjörður
 Ólafsfjörður Airport

Airports in Iceland